"Go Get It" is a 2012 song by rapper T.I.

Go Get It may also refer to:
Go Get It (album), an album by Mary Mary, or the title track
"Go Get It", a 2010 song by The Hrsmn
"Go Get It", a 2012 song by JAE E with E-40 and Thaddeous Shade
"Go Get It", a 2008 song by Ladi6